Dipna Lim Prasad (born 7 June 1991 in Singapore) is a Singaporean sprinter and hurdler. At the 2012 Summer Olympics, she competed in the Women's 100 metres hurdles. Dipna specialises in the 100 metres hurdles but also competes in the 100 metres, 200 metres, 400 metres hurdles, 4x100 metres relay, and 4 x 400 metres relay.

Education 
Dipna enrolled into the Singapore Sports School in 2004 as part of the pioneer batch. She graduated in 2007 after completing her secondary school education. She holds a diploma in Sports and Exercise Science from Auckland University of Technology from which she graduated in 2009. Later, in 2010, Dipna furthered her education in Nanyang Technological University where she graduated in 2014 with a degree in Sport Science and Management.

Records 
Dipna is the 400 metres hurdles national record holder. At the 2013 Southeast Asian Games in Myanmar, she became the first Singaporean to run under 60 seconds for the 400 metre hurdles.

From 2008–2014, Dipna held the 100 metre hurdles women's national record and Junior Record for Singapore from 2008–2014. In 2013, Dipna broke Prema Govindan's 29-year-old national 200 metres national record. Dipna has not run a 200-metre since, and her record has since been broken. Dipna has represented Singapore in the 2012 London Olympics; 2011 IAAF World Championships; 2012 IAAF World Indoor Championships; several editions of the South East Asian Games; Asian Athletic Championships; and Asian Indoor Athletic Championships.

Personal life 
Dipna married her boyfriend of six years, and fellow runner, Poh Seng Song in 2014.

References

External links
 
 
 

Living people
1991 births
Singaporean female hurdlers
Singaporean female sprinters
Olympic athletes of Singapore
Athletes (track and field) at the 2012 Summer Olympics
Asian Games competitors for Singapore
Athletes (track and field) at the 2014 Asian Games
Athletes (track and field) at the 2018 Asian Games
World Athletics Championships athletes for Singapore
Southeast Asian Games medalists in athletics
Singapore Sports School alumni
Nanyang Technological University alumni
Southeast Asian Games silver medalists for Singapore
Southeast Asian Games bronze medalists for Singapore
Competitors at the 2013 Southeast Asian Games
Competitors at the 2015 Southeast Asian Games
Competitors at the 2017 Southeast Asian Games
Singaporean people of Chinese descent
Singaporean people of Indian descent
21st-century Singaporean women